Wang Chung-yi (born 21 May 1952) is a Taiwanese politician. He was the Minister of the Coast Guard Administration of the Executive Yuan from 8 December 2014 until 20 May 2016.

Education
Wang obtained his bachelor's degree in law from National Chung Hsing University in 1974, and a master's degree from the College of Management of National Sun Yat-sen University.

References

Political office-holders in the Republic of China on Taiwan
Living people
1952 births